Paperville Creek is a stream in the U.S. state of Tennessee.

Paperville Creek took its name from a paper mill near its course. A settlement called Paperville also once existed in the area.

References

Rivers of Sullivan County, Tennessee
Rivers of Tennessee